Duppalapudi is a village in Vizianagaram District, Andhra Pradesh, India.
Kandipalli, vykuntam, seera Chukka, Thangudu, pyla and kolli are the families living in this village.

            This village is historically famous for lot of well educated people. Kandipalli Sanysi Naidu is a philanthropist, spiritual teacher  and social worker and he guided so many students  and they had attained good positions in the society. His Son Kandipalli RamaKrishna rao has been working as a DIET lecturer and trained many good teachers. Seera Appala Naidu is one of the philosophy guru who lived in this village and organized lot of spiritual meets.A district officer Seera Swami Naidu, doctor Chukka Jagannadha Rao and vykuntam kurma rao and lot lot of teachers and officers born and brought up from this village.

References

Villages in Vizianagaram district